There are two triga sculptures installed on the roof corners of the National Theatre in Prague, Czech Republic. The horses are controlled by the winged goddess Victoria. The sculptures were proposed and modeled by Czech sculptor Bohuslav Schnirch (1845–1901) and created by Ladislav Šaloun (1870–1946). The works were installed in 1911. Šaloun's wife, Julia, served as the model for Victoria. The statues were renovated several times, most recently in 2008.

References

External links

 

1911 establishments in Europe
1911 sculptures
Horses in art
Outdoor sculptures in Prague
Sculptures of goddesses
Sculptures of classical mythology
Sculptures of women in the Czech Republic
Statues in Prague
New Town, Prague